Chandler Sprague (died November 15, 1955) was an American veteran, screenwriter, reporter, and columnist. He served in World War I (for which he received the Distinguished Service Cross, the Silver Star, and the Purple Heart) and World War II. He was a reporter for The Baltimore Sun and a movie columnist for the Los Angeles Examiner, and he worked for United Artists, Paramount Pictures, and Metro-Goldwyn-Mayer. He wrote the scripts of many movies, including Camille, The Street of Sin, and The Bashful Bachelor.

References

External links
Charles Sprague on IMDb

1955 deaths
People from Haverhill, Massachusetts
Western Maryland College alumni
American male screenwriters
Screenwriters from California
Screenwriters from Massachusetts
20th-century American screenwriters
20th-century American male writers